Sanhe is a town in the southwest of Guangdong province in Southern China. It is under the jurisdiction of Taishan City, and as of 2008, had a population of 48000. , it has one residential community and 9 villages under its administration.

References

External links
Taishan City Sanhe Town (in Simplified Chinese)

Taishan, Guangdong
Towns in Guangdong